Grasscroft railway station served the village of Grasscroft between 1912 and 1955.

History
The station opened on 1 January 1912, on the London and North Western Railway route from Oldham to Greenfield. It was located not far from the portal of Lydgate Tunnel. It closed temporarily on 16 July 1917, reopening on 1 January 1919.

The station closed permanently on 2 May 1955, when the Delph Donkey passenger train service to  via Greenfield was withdrawn.

References

An Illustrated History of Oldham's Railways by John Hooper

External links
Grasscroft Station on navigable 1948 O.S. map

Disused railway stations in the Metropolitan Borough of Oldham
Former London and North Western Railway stations
Railway stations in Great Britain opened in 1912
Railway stations in Great Britain closed in 1917
Railway stations in Great Britain opened in 1919
Railway stations in Great Britain closed in 1955
1912 establishments in England